Mulligan stew, also known as Hobo stew, is a type of stew  said to have been prepared by American hobos in camps in the early 1900s.

Another variation of mulligan stew is "community stew", a stew put together by several homeless people by combining whatever food they have or can collect. Community stews are often made at "hobo jungles", or at events designed to help homeless people.

Description
Mulligan stew is broadly defined as a stew made of odds and ends or any available ingredients. A description of mulligan stew appeared in a 1900 newspaper:

Another traveler present described the operation of making a "mulligan." Five or six hobos join in this. One builds a fire and rustles a can. Another has to procure meat; another potatoes; one fellow pledges himself to obtain bread, and still another has to furnish onions, salt and pepper. If a chicken can be stolen, so much the better. The whole outfit is placed in the can and boiled until it is done. If one of the men is successful in procuring "Java," an oyster can is used for a coffee tank, and this is also put on the fire to boil. Incidentally, it may be mentioned that California hobos always put a "snipe" in their coffee, to give it that delicate amber color and to add to the aroma. "Snipe" is hobo for the butt end of a cigar that smokers throw down in the streets. All hobos have large quantities of snipes in their pockets, for both chewing and smoking purposes. A "beggar stew" is a "mulligan," without any meat.

Ingredients
"Mulligan" is a stand-in term for any Irishman, and Mulligan stew is simply an Irish stew that includes meat, potatoes, vegetables, and whatever else can be begged, scavenged, found or stolen. A local Appalachian variant is a burgoo, which may comprise such available ingredients as possum or squirrel. Only a pot and a fire are required. The hobo who put it together was known as the "mulligan mixer."

During the Great Depression, homeless men (hobos) would sleep in a "hobo jungle" (a campsite used by the homeless near a railway). Traditionally, the jungle would have a large campfire and a pot into which each person would put in a portion of their food, to create a shared dish that was, hopefully, more tasteful and varied than his original portion.  Usually, they would afterward enjoy themselves with story-telling and, sometimes, the drinking of alcohol.

In popular culture

Literature
In George R.R. Martin's book series A Song of Ice and Fire, the impoverished smallfolk of King's Landing rely often on a communal stew called Bowl of Brown for sustenance - Bowl of Brown is the fictional equivalent of Mulligan Stew
John Varley's The Golden Globe has an extended description of the mulligan as a perpetual stew.

Music
The verse to Rodgers and Hart's showtune "The Lady Is a Tramp" (from the 1937 Babes in Arms) begins: "I've wined and dined on Mulligan Stew, and never wished for turkey."
The song "Old Pigweed" on Mark Knopfler's album The Ragpicker's Dream describes a mulligan stew being prepared, but ruined, by addition of old pigweed.
A line in the song "Whistlin' Past the Graveyard" on Tom Waits' album Blue Valentine is: "Cooked up a mess o' mulligan and got into a fight". The opening verses of this song contain railroad/hobo-related imagery.

Television
(Alphabetical by series title)
In the Andy Griffith Show episode, "Opie and His Merry Men", the hobo Opie and his friends come across in the beginning tells them that he is having mulligan stew.
In the Bonanza episode, "The Saga of Annie O'Toole", the title character, a recent Irish arrival to the frontier, offers mulligan stew in the ad hoc restaurant she opens to serve the silver miners in Nevada. 
In The Rifleman episode, "The Sixteenth Cousin", when asked what she suggests, Ms. Mallory says: "The mulligan stew is very good tonight". However, Mulligan stew is believed to have been created early in the 1900s, and The Rifleman is set in the 1880s.

See also

 Booyah (stew), a social stew popular in parts of Minnesota and Wisconsin
 Brunswick stew
 Burgoo, often prepared communally
 List of stews
 Mulligatawny soup
 Stone soup, also known as button soup, wood soup, nail soup, and axe soup, often prepared communally

References

Further reading

American stews
Historical foods in American cuisine
Peasant food